Keith Foy (born 30 December 1981 in Dublin) is an  Irish footballer.

A left footed player, Foy began his career in England with Nottingham Forest in 2000. Foy made his Nottingham Forest debut on 23 September 2000 against Grimsby Town, and played 38 times, scoring once, against Tranmere Rovers, before signing for Doncaster Rovers in February 2003.

However, he played just seven games for Doncaster and then returned to Ireland to play for St Patrick's Athletic, Dublin City, Monaghan United and then signed for Sligo Rovers . He also had an unsuccessful trial at Mansfield Town

Foy is a former Republic of Ireland youth and Under 21 international and in May 1998 scored in the final as part of the Irish team which won the European Under 16 Championships beating Italy 2-1 .

References

Honours

Republic of Ireland
UEFA U-16 Championship: 1998

Living people
1981 births
Republic of Ireland association footballers
Republic of Ireland youth international footballers
Republic of Ireland under-21 international footballers
Nottingham Forest F.C. players
Doncaster Rovers F.C. players
League of Ireland players
St Patrick's Athletic F.C. players
Monaghan United F.C. players
Sligo Rovers F.C. players
Dublin City F.C. players
Association football midfielders